is a cooking simulator for the Nintendo DS. It was released on July 20, 2006 in Japan.

Brief information
The software contains numerous Japanese recipes with step by step instructions, and the user can use the Nintendo DS's microphone for voice-recognition commands like turning pages. All the instructions are read out loud, while some instructions are video recordings showing how to do some tasks like chopping. It is possible to choose recipes based on a number of calories, the ingredients the user has and so forth. The simulator also keeps in memory what dishes the player has already made. It also features a timer. As a bonus, the Game & Watch game, Chef, can also be played in this DS title.

Reception
Shaberu! DS Oryōri Navi received an Excellence Prize for Entertainment at the 2006 Japan Media Arts Festival.

Sequels and Spinoffs
Shaberu! DS Oryōri Navi gave birth to five sequels, with development split between Nintendo and Koei. Nintendo itself issued a Japan only sequel , an internationally released sequel in the 2008 title Cooking Guide: Can't Decide What to Eat?, and the North America-only 2010 release America's Test Kitchen: Let's Get Cooking, based on the PBS program, America's Test Kitchen after Cook's Illustrated magazine helped the publisher to write the game. 

Legacy
A musical remix based on this Nintendo DS title was used in Super Smash Bros. Brawl, where it was heard in the Kirby Final Smash update. This was only heard on the Japanese version of the official website; however, the song was added to all versions of Super Smash Bros. Brawl as one of the songs for the PictoChat stage.

References

External links 
  Official Website (Japanese)
  a Go Nintendo article describing the features

2006 video games
Cookbooks
Cooking video games
Indieszero games
Japan-exclusive video games
Nintendo DS games
Nintendo DS-only games
Nintendo Entertainment Analysis and Development games
Single-player video games
Touch! Generations
Video games developed in Japan
ja:しゃべる!DSお料理ナビ